OR Books is a New York City-based independent publishing house founded by John Oakes and Colin Robinson in 2009. The company sells digital and print-on-demand books directly to the customer and focuses on creative promotion through traditional media and the Internet. On its site, OR Books states that it "embraces progressive change in politics, culture and the way we do business."

Not long after its founding in 2009, OR Books became known for publishing Going Rouge: Sarah Palin, An American Nightmare, a parody of Palin's autobiography Going Rogue: An American Life. Going Rouge became a best-seller as per The New York Times. Since then the company has published books by Julian Assange, Moustafa Bayoumi, Medea Benjamin, Patrick Cockburn, Sue Coe, Simon Critchley, Lisa Dierbeck, Ariel Dorfman, Norman Finkelstein, Laura Flanders, Chris Lehmann, Gordon Lish, Bill McKibben, Eileen Myles, Yoko Ono, Barney Rosset, Douglas Rushkoff, Elissa Shevinsky, Burhan Sönmez, Jeanne Thornton, Slavoj Žižek, and others.

Founders
According to OR's website, John Oakes co-founded the publishing company Four Walls Eight Windows and was subsequently publisher of Thunder's Mouth Press and co-publisher of Nation Books. He is publisher of the Evergreen Review. Colin Robinson, a former senior editor at Scribner, was previously managing director of Verso Books and publisher of The New Press.

Joint ventures
In September 2010, OR Books announced a partnership with a writers' collective known as Mischief & Mayhem, whose members include Dale Peck, Lisa Dierbeck, Joshua Furst, DW Gibson, and Choire Sicha.

In what the industry newsblog Shelf Awareness termed a "very significant...move," St. Mark’s Bookshop and OR Books announced a joint venture to enable the store’s customers to buy select books on OR’s list from the bookstore’s website.

In April 2016, OR Books acquired UK publishing company Serif, following the death in 2015 of its founder Stephen Hayward, a former associate of Robinson's.

In May 2016, OR Books and Counterpoint Press announced a partnership whereby Counterpoint would put several OR titles into stores.

References

External links
 Company site
 OR Books on Facebook.
 John Oakes, "Disintermediating Amazon", Publishers Weekly, May 18, 2012.
 Colin Robinson, "The Loneliness of the Long-Distance Reader", The New York Times, January 4, 2014.
 Mischief + Mayhem
 Kat Meyer, "TOC Evolvers: OR Books", August 7, 2010. Interview with John Oakes on O'Reilly Media's TOC (Tools of Change for Publishing).
 Publishers Weekly discusses OR Books in its 2010 roundup, January 3, 2011.
 Jim Barnes, "Indie Groundbreaking Publisher: OR Books — A Brave New Publishing Model", Independent Publisher article about the success of Going Rouge.
 Interview with Colin Robinson on NPR's On the Media
  Chad W. Post, "OR Books Preaches Elegant Direct Model", Publishing Perspectives, October 6, 2010. 
 "Words & Music Festival 2011 featured fireworks, and a little sadness", Nola.com, November 15, 2011 (showdown between OR co-publisher John Oakes and Random House editor).
 Dennis Sweeney, "Interview with Colin Robinson, Co-Founder, OR Books", Entropy Magazine, January 2014.

Book publishing companies based in New York (state)
Political book publishing companies
Publishing companies based in New York City
Small press publishing companies
Publishing companies established in 2009
2009 establishments in New York City
American companies established in 2009